La Ley is the band's third album. It was produced by Alejandro Sanfuentes and released in February 1993 by Polygram. The album includes the number one hits "Tejedores de Ilusión" (which was used in a nationwide Pepsi campaign in Chile) and "Auto-Ruta (Feel the Skin)", whose music video was banned from some television shows such as Canal 13's Más Música because of explicit content.

Track listing

Personnel

La Ley
Andrés Bobe – guitar
Mauricio Clavería – drums
Alberto "Beto" Cuevas – vocals
Luciano Rojas – bass

Others
Alejandro Sanfuentes – producer

External links 
Official site

1992 albums
La Ley (band) albums